Peter Bensley (born 6 February 1954, Warialda, New South Wales) is an Australian actor.

Early roles
One of Bensley's earliest roles was as Dennis Braithwaite on the Seven Network drama series Class Of '74. He also appeared in ABC Television children's show, Waterloo Street, with long hair.

Career
Bensley went on to appear in several Grundy Television soap operas including The Restless Years in 1979; The Young Doctors, in which he played Dr. Mike Newman from 1980 until the show finished in 1983; Prisoner, in which he played one of the three male prisoners, Matt Delaney, for 34 episodes in 1984; Neighbours as guest character Tony Chapman in 1986; and Home and Away from 1988 to 1990 as school teacher Andrew Foley. In 2009, he returned to Neighbours for a two-episode guest role as Dean Naughton.

In the 1980s, Bensley appeared as a nude centrefold in the magazine, Cleo, wearing only strategically placed scuba gear; and also featured in a cheeky advertisement for Palmolive Gold, in which he is seen in bed with fellow The Young Doctors actress Judy McBurney, and semi-naked in a shower.

Film and mini-series
In 1983, he played the title role of Stanley in the film Stanley; Every Home Should Have One.
In 1992, Bensley appeared as Dr. John Austin in the Australian mini-series The New Adventures of Black Beauty. In 1995, he appeared in the Australian/New Zealand co-production Mirror, Mirror, as "Andrew Teigan", father of "Jo Teigan".

Other roles 
Bensley also appeared in the long-running television series Water Rats about the Sydney Harbour Water Police Squad, in which he had the major role of Chief Inspector Jeff Hawker. Bensley was a member of the cast of Water Rats for the entire series (1996–2001).

Author
His first fiction book, On a Wing and a Prayer, was published in 2006.

Personal life
Bensley and his partner have 3 children.

Notable roles 
 Dr. John Austin in The New Adventures of Black Beauty
 Chief Inspector Jeff Hawker in Water Rats
 Andrew Teigan in Mirror, Mirror
 Dr Mike Newman in The Young Doctors
 Matt Delaney in Prisoner 1984

References

External links
 
 Peter Bensley – "The Young Doctors" 
 Peter Bensley – "Water Rats"
 Peter Bensley – "Water Rats"
 Author page at Random House publishers

1954 births
Living people
Australian male film actors
Australian male soap opera actors
20th-century Australian male actors
21st-century Australian male actors